Wasaline, previously Oy Vaasa-Umeå Ab (1948–1965), Vaasa-Umeå AB (1965–1979), Oy Vaasanlaivat – Vasabåtarna Ab (1979–1991) and Wasa Line (1991–1993) are different names for the Finnish shipping company that ceased trading in 1993 when it merged into Silja Line. Since 2013 the name is being used by a new company that operates between Vaasa (homebase) and Umeå.

History

In 1948, Rederi Ab Vasa-Umeå was founded to start passenger traffic across Kvarken, the narrowest part of the Gulf of Bothnia. On 28 May, the company's first ship MS Turisten made its first journey from Vaasa in Finland to Umeå in Sweden. People living on both sides of Kvarken are predominantly Swedish-speaking, as were the company founders, hence the company originally only had a name in Swedish and ships were named in Swedish.

The company's first ships were used steamers, only capable of summer traffic. In 1958, Merivienti Oy, subsidiary of the Finnish forest industry giant Enso-Gutzeit, became the largest owner of Rederi Ab Vasa-Umeå. With funds from the new owner, the company could purchase their first ship capable of carrying cars, SS Korsholm III. In 1962, the company was delivered its only newbuild, MS Vaasa, a freighter that spent most of its career in the company chartered elsewhere, until it was sold in 1964.

Oy Vaasa-Umeå Ab

In 1964, the company's first genuine car and passenger ferry was purchased from Sessan Linjen. Wasa Express started a trend of buying ships from Sessan Linjen, as well as the trend of giving ships names ending with Express. In 1965, the company name was changed into the bilingual form Oy Vaasa – Umeå Ab. In 1970, a line from Vaasa to Örnsköldsvik was opened. The following year the company expanded further, opening a line between Pori and Sundsvall, however it proved unprofitable and was cancelled the following year.

In 1976, Vaasa-Umeå purchased MS Viking 3 from Rederi Ab Sally, and reused the name Wasa Express for her. During the following decade three of her sister ships would also find their way into Vaasa-Umeå's fleet. In fact the company had considered ordering a newbuild of the same class in the early 70's, but had decided it would be too expensive.

Vaasanlaivat – Vasabåtarna

Enso-Gutzeit became the sole owner of Vaasa-Umeå in 1979, and changed the company's name to Vaasanlaivat – Vasabåtarna (The Vaasa Boats). The same year Wasa Express' sister ship MS Botnia Express was added to the company's fleet. In 1981, the company chartered MS Wasa Star from Rederi AB Gotland, bringing the first large ferry to the Gulf of Bothnia. Unfortunately there were not enough passengers to support such a large ship and she was laid up in autumn 1982, later subchartered to Karageorgios Line in Greece. In 1982 Enso-Gutzeit decided to bow out of the shipping business, and Vaasanlaivat was sold to Rederi Ab Sally (most of their other operations passed to Effoa).

1986 saw the purchase of one of the longest operating ships on the Gulf of Botnia, when MS Fennia was purchased from Jakob Lines. A part of the payment was made in the form of MS Fenno Express, a small ship better suited for Jakob Lines' traffic. By this time,  Sally was doing rather badly financially, and in 1987 the company was purchased by Effoa and Johnson Line, the owners of Silja Line. The purchase had no immediate effect, although it did eventually prove decisive to the future of Vaasanlaivat.

Wasa Line

In 1989, Vaasanlaivat acquired Jakob Lines, hence starting to traffic between Jakobstad and Kokkola in Finland and Skellefteå in Sweden. Officially Jakob Lines survived until 1991, but by that time all their ships had the funnel markings of Vaasanlaivat. In 1990, Vaasanlaivat's owners merged into EffJohn. 1991 saw the company's name changed into a more international form,  Wasa Line, and the purchase of the new MS Wasa King from their sister company Silja Line. The following year Wasa King was joined by another former Silja ferry, MS Wasa Queen. Wasa Line proved to be short-lived however, as by 1993 EffJohn were forced to reorganise their operations in order to save money, and Wasa Line was merged into Silja Line.

Silja continued to operate on Kvarken, but the line to Sundsvall was cancelled in 1996, and after the termination of tax-free sales on intra-European Union travel, Silja bowed out of traffic in the area altogether in the year 2000. For a while there was no traffic across Kvarken, until spring 2001 when the newly found RG Line purchased the Fennia from Silja Line and started up traffic from Vaasa to Umeå.

After several years of struggling service, Wasa Line established itself as a reliable and valuable cargo route between Vaasa and Umeå, and passenger numbers began rising once again. Finally between years of 2018 and 2020 a decision was made to buy a brand new ferry on the route, replacing the aging Wasa Express. Her maiden voyage is set to happen during spring of 2021. A contest was held to name the ferry, and Aurora Botnia was chosen as the name. The ferry is built in Rauma, Finland.

Ships

Not a complete list.

 Botnia Express (1979–1992)
 Wasa Star (1981–1982)
 Fennia (1986–1993)
 Wasa King (1991–1993)
 Wasa Queen (1992–1993)
 Wasa Express (2013–2021)
 Aurora Botnia (2021-)

References

Wasaline (current company)—
Vasabåtarna – nostalgi (Swedish)
Kvarkentrafiken återupptas i dag – news (Swedish)

Shipping companies of Finland
Defunct shipping companies
Defunct transport companies of Finland
Vaasa
Transport companies established in 1948
Transport companies disestablished in 2013
1948 establishments in Finland
2013 disestablishments in Finland